Time on Earth is a 2007 album by Crowded House.

Time on Earth may also refer to:

 "Time on Earth", a song by Robbie Williams from The Heavy Entertainment Show
 A Time on Earth, a 1963 novel by Vilhelm Moberg

See also
 Longevity
 Standard time
 Time zone